Western Region is one of the traditional eight regions of Iceland, located on the western coast of the island. It is the only region for which the largest town, Akranes, is not the municipal capital.